Battery Gut is a stream in the United States Virgin Islands.

References

Rivers of the United States Virgin Islands